Rachel Devirys (28 February 1890 - 16 May 1983) was a French film actress born in the Crimea, Russian Empire (now Ukraine). She starred in some 50 films between 1916 and 1956.

Born Rachel Itzkovitz, in 1916 she played "Madelon", the name role in a popular song of World War I.

Partial filmography

 Rita (1917)
 La grande vedette (1917)
 Le retour aux champs (1918) - Mariette
 L'accusé (1918)
 La nouvelle aurore (1919) - Nina Noha
 Celle qui n'a pas dit son nom (1919)
 Au-delà des lois humaines (1920) - Nadia Navinska
 Le doute (1921)
 Prisca (1921)
 Maître Évora (1922)
 La voix de l'océan (1922) - Ethel Devirys
 Vidocq (1923) - Yolande de la Roche Bernard
 Para toda la vida (1923) - Euphémia
 Les deux baisers (1924)
 Faces of Children (1925) - Jeanne Dutois, zweite Frau Amslers
 Monte Carlo (1925) - Madame de Fontanes
 Le château de la mort lente (1926) - la comtesse Maud
 Le berceau de dieu (1926) - Hérodiade
 La nuit de la revanche (1926)
 La bonne hôtesse (1926) - Marinette
 Morgane, the Enchantress (1928) - Madame Le Foulon
 Croquette (1928) - Lola Morelli
 L'emprise (1929)
 La vocation (1929)
 L'appel du large (1929)
 Maternité (1930) - Louise
 Bombs on Monte Carlo (1931) - Diana
 Captain Craddock (1931) - Diane
 Ariane, jeune fille russe (1932) - Aunt Warwara
 Love and Luck (1932) - Nina Delaporte
 Je vous aimerai toujours (1933) - Madame de Saint-Obin
 Die Abenteuer des Königs Pausole (1933) - Perchuqué
 Les aventures du roi Pausole (1933) - Dame Perchuque
 Crainquebille (1934) - Madame Laure
 Famille nombreuse (1934)
 Le vertige (1935) - La princesse Koupiska
 Les dieux s'amusent (1935)
 L'école des vierges (1935)
 Bach the Detective (1936) - La maîtresse de maison
 Les demi-vierges (1936) - Mme de Rouvre
 Gigolette (1937)
 Colonel Durand (1948) - Mme Nieburger
 Piège à hommes (1949)
 Nous avons tous fait la même chose (1950)
 Les Enfants terribles (1950)
 Trois de la Canebière (1955) - Me Olivier
 Gervaise (1956) - Mme Fauconnier

References

External links 

French stage actresses
French film actresses
French silent film actresses
Actors from Simferopol
People from Nice
Emigrants from the Russian Empire to France
1890 births
1983 deaths
20th-century French actresses